P day, P-Day, or P. Day may refer to:

P-Day, a US military designation of time
Pea Ridge Day (1899–1934), American baseball player
Peter Day (disambiguation), various people